José Alfredo Castillo Parada (born February 9, 1983) is a Bolivian football attacker who plays for Wilstermann.

Club career
In 1991, he enrolled in the Tahuichi academy.

In 2002, he scored 42 league goals for Oriente Petrolero, and RSSSF indicated he was the highest league goalscorer in the world that year.

International career
Castillo has been capped for the Bolivia national team 24 times, scoring a total of 6 goals in international competitions.

References

External links
 
 
 
 

1983 births
Living people
Sportspeople from Santa Cruz de la Sierra
Association football forwards
Bolivian footballers
Bolivia international footballers
Bolivian expatriate footballers
Oriente Petrolero players
Tecos F.C. footballers
Club Bolívar players
Rosario Central footballers
O'Higgins F.C. footballers
Clube Atlético Mineiro players
South China AA players
Club Blooming players
Guabirá players
Bolivian Primera División players
Liga MX players
Chilean Primera División players
Expatriate footballers in Mexico
Expatriate footballers in Argentina
Expatriate footballers in Chile
Expatriate footballers in Brazil
Expatriate footballers in Hong Kong
Hong Kong First Division League players